The Reformed Congregations in the Netherlands (Dutch: Gereformeerden Gemeenten in Nederland, abbreviated GGiN)  is a pietistic Reformed church located mainly in the Netherlands, along with five congregations in North America and one in Pretoria, South Africa.

History 
The church was founded in 1953 when Dr. C. Steenblok was dismissed from the theological seminary of the Reformed Congregations in Rotterdam, because he taught that God does not offer grace to all sinners, but only those persons who are elected and acknowledge their sins. In 1980 the church split.

Statistics 
The church had a membership of 23,786 in 2010. There were 23,985 members in 2019. On 1 January 2022, the church had 23,695 members in 49 congregations.

Famous members 
 Frans Mallan
 Cornelis Steenblok
 Rinus Terlouw

See also 
 De Hoeksteen, Barneveld

References 

Reformed denominations in the Netherlands
Christian organizations established in 1953